Edwardsburg High School is a public high school, serving grades 9-12 in Edwardsburg, Michigan, United States.

History
The name of the school team was changed from the Golden Bears to the Eddies in the early 1940s. The first yearbook was published in 1946 and was called Eddie's Diaries.

Academics
Edwardsburg High School has been accredited by North Central Association (and its successors) since 1972. In the 2019 U.S. News & World Report annual rankings of US high schools, Edwardsburg ranked 7,875th nationally and 274th in Michigan.

Demographics
The demographic breakdown of the 859 students enrolled for 2017-18 was:
Male - 49.0%
Female - 51.0%
Native American/Alaskan - 0.5%
Asian - 1.4%
Black - 0.8%
Hispanic - 3.0%
Native Hawaiian/Pacific islanders - 0.1%
White - 91.0%
Multiracial - 3.2%
27.6% of the students were eligible for free or reduced-cost lunch. For 2017-18, Edwardsburg was a Title I school.

Athletics
The Edwardsburg Eddies are a member of the Wolverine Conference and the MHSAA. The school colors are orange and blue. Sports offered are:

Baseball (boys)
Basketball (girls and boys) 
Competitive cheerleading (girls)
Cross country (girls and boys) 
Football (boys)
State champion - 2018
Golf (girls and boys) 
Soccer (girls and boys) 
Softball (girls)
Tennis (girls and boys) 
Track (girls and boys) 
Volleyball (girls) 
State champion - 1977
Wrestling 
Bowling (girls and boys)
Competitive Cheer (girls)

Notable alumni
 Becky Breisch - Track and field athlete
 Megan and Liz - Country and pop girl duo

References

External links

School district website

Public high schools in Michigan
Education in Cass County, Michigan